Honnāli is a panchayat town in Davanagere district in the Indian state of Karnataka. Its name is derived from honnu alli, which means "gold".

Geography
The Tungabhadra River flows through the area. It is 40km north of Shimoga,
44km Northwest of channagiri 46km south of Ranebennur, 35km southwest of Harihar and east of Shikaripur (37km), Shirallakoppa (57km) and Munchikoppa (61km).

Demographics
As of the 2001 census, Honnali had a population of 15,574. Males constitute 51% of the population and females 49%. Honnali has an average literacy rate of 68%, higher than the national average of 59.5%; male literacy is 73%, and female literacy is 62%. In Honnali, 12% of the population is under 6 years of age. The principal occupation is agriculture.

Sites of interest
Thirtha Rameshwara, known for a temple to Lord Shiva temple, is nearby, and Shree Madhava Ranganatha Swamy Temple is also in the vicinity, located on the banks of the River Tungabhadra in the neighbouring village of Gollarahalli. 

Sri Raghavendra Swami Mutt, also known as the Second Mantralaya, is known for its local historical importance.

References

Cities and towns in Davanagere district